Jim Eldridge (born November 1944) is an English radio, film and television screenwriter with hundreds of radio and TV scripts broadcast in the United Kingdom and across the world in a career spanning over 30 years.

Eldridge is the creator and writer of radio shows including Shut UP, King Street Junior, Coming Alive, Crosswords, Albert and Me, Parsley Sidings and The Demon Headmaster.  On TV, he has created children's science fiction drama Powers, Time of My Life and Uncle Jack and written for The Ghost Hunter, Julia Jekyll and Harriet Hyde, and Up the Elephant and Round the Castle, in addition to other TV and radio series.

In 1971 he sold his first sitcom to the BBC and had his first book commissioned. Since then he has had more than 100 books published, which have sold over three million copies.
He lives in Kent with his wife.

Bibliography
"Warpath" Series
Warpath 1: Tank Attack 
Warpath 2: Deadly Skies 
Warpath 3: Behind Enemy Lines 
Warpath 4: Depth Charge Danger 
Warpath 5: Last Convoy
Warpath 6: Beach Assault
Warpath 7: Night Bomber 
Warpath 8: Island Of Fear 

"My Story" Series
My Story: The Trenches (2002) 
My Story: Armada (2002)
My Story: Flying Ace (2003)
My Story: Spy Smuggler (2004)
My Story: Desert Danger (2005)

"Museum mysteries"
Murder at the Fitzwilliam (2018)
Murder at the British Museum (2019)
Murder at the Ashmolean (2019)
Murder at the Manchester Museum (2020)
Murder at the Natural History Museum (2020)
Murder at Madame Tussauds (2021)
Murder at the National Gallery (2022)

"Hotel mysteries"
Murder at the Ritz: The Stylish Wartime Whodunnit (2021)
Murder at the Savoy: The Sophisticated Wartime Whodunnit (2021)
''Murder at Claridge's: The Elegant Wartime Whodunnit (2022)

Writing credits

Awards and nominations

References

External links 

 
 Jim Eldridge homepage
 Jim Eldridge Interview
 Parsley Sidings episode guide

British male screenwriters
English children's writers
1944 births
Living people
English male writers